Costonia is an unincorporated community in Jefferson County, in the U.S. state of Ohio.

History
A post office called Costonia was established in 1897, and remained in operation until 1937. Besides the post office, Costonia had a country store.

References

Unincorporated communities in Jefferson County, Ohio
Unincorporated communities in Ohio